The Third Hand is the third studio album by RJD2. It was released on XL Records on March 6, 2007. It peaked at number 190 on the Billboard 200 chart, number 5 on the Heatseekers Albums chart, and number 23 on the Independent Albums chart. The Third Hand Instrumentals, an instrumental version of the album, was also released in 2007.

Critical reception

At Metacritic, which assigns a weighted average score out of 100 to reviews from mainstream critics, the album received an average score of 60, based on 28 reviews, indicating "mixed or average reviews".

Noel Murray of The A.V. Club gave the album a grade of B−, saying: "About half of The Third Hand is given over to dub exercises and soundtrack-ready soundscapes, while the other half pushes fairly conventional alt-pop, heavy on the Beatles-esque flourishes." Dave Heaton of PopMatters gave the album 5 stars out of 10, saying: "You may have to listen past a few layers to be satisfied, but there is a level of satisfaction to be found."

Track listing

Charts

References

External links
 

2007 albums
RJD2 albums
XL Recordings albums